Chris Gibbin is an American filmmaker, producer and entrepreneur whose first feature film, From Within, had its worldwide premiere at the 2008 Tribeca Film Festival and went on to win the 2008 Grand Jury Prize at the Solstice Film Festival. Lost Angeles, his second feature film, starring Joelle Carter and Kelly Blatz, had its world premiere at the Oldenburg International Film Festival in 2012.

Advertising work 

In 1996, Gibbin founded DNA Studio, a Los Angeles-based online advertising agency, with offices in New York, Atlanta and Los Angeles. Key clients included  Anheuser-Busch and AT&T. In 1999 and 2000 DNA was the winner of CLIO Awards for their digital work for Maverick Records and 20th Century Fox. 
 
DNA had grown to a 140+ agency before 2006 when Gibbin sold DNA to Whittman-Hart to form one of the largest U.S. independent interactive agencies.

Gibbin founded Something Massive in 2009 with partners John Moshay and Rebecca Coleman. Key clients include Plum Organics and Regal Entertainment Group.

Film 

Chris was the producer behind Carmen Electra's line of Aerobic Striptease fitness videos and Paula Abdul's Cardio Cheer DVD series, along with 12 other DVD fitness titles.

In 2007, Gibbin produced the independent thriller From Within, directed by Phedon Papamichael and released by Lionsgate Entertainment. It was the 2008 Grand Jury Award Winner at the Solstice Film Festival and was included in the 2008 After Dark "8 Films to Die For" festival.

In 2011, Gibbin and Papamichael teamed up again to produce the independent comedy-drama Lost Angeles, starring Justified's Joelle Carter and Kelly Blatz. The film premiered at the Oldenburg International Film Festival on September 16, 2012.

In 2014 Chris Gibbin wrote and directed Buddy starring Joelle Carter and Ryan O'Nan, a short film that premiered at the St. Tropez International Film Festival, with further festival showings at LA Shorts Fest 2014, Nine Worlds International Film Festival  2014 and the Carmel International Film Festival 2014.

Advanced filmmaking 

In late 2012, Gibbin joined forces with two-time Academy Award winner Janusz Kamiński; Academy Award winner Wally Pfister, ASC; Academy Award nominee Phedon Papamichael, ASC; and producer Jacqueline Legan to create Advancedfilmmaking.com. The site contains over 22 hours of interviews with some of the industry's top filmmakers, including Alexander Payne and Wim Wenders.

Branded content 

In 2004, Gibbin created and produced MDN, a half-hour variety show on Spike TV featuring action, sports, and comedy, for Mountain Dew.

In 2007, Gibbin created Dewmocracy, a story-driven fan based advertising campaign for Mountain Dew, that let consumers choose the next new flavor for the soda. The campaign featured an in-depth virtual world and a video directed by Oscar winner Forest Whitaker.

On behalf of Regal Entertainment Group, which operates the largest theatre circuit in the United States, Gibbin and his agency Something Massive developed and produced an original branded YouTube series starring exclusively Vine celebrities in 2013. The series, Date Night Fails, starred Vine celebrities Jason Nash, Brittany Furlan, and KC James, among others. In addition to the videos, the Viners participated in a cross-platform campaign consisting of branded Vines to help support the series.

On the heels of their early success with Date Night Fails, Chris and his agency again teamed up with Regal Cinemas in 2014 to create and produce two separate ongoing branded web series for the theatre chain: The Regalist and The Trailer. The Regalist, starring stand-up comedian Baron Vaughn, utilizes the themes and characteristics of upcoming films as the justification for a list of top movie moments in film history (e.g. "Top 7 Creepiest Dolls in Movies"). The Trailer is a weekly movie talk show hosted by comedians Yassir Lester and Erin Gibson.

Filmography 

Advanced Filmmaking - Producer, 2014
Buddy - Writer/Director, 2013
Lost Angeles - Producer, 2012
From Within - Producer, 2008
Dewmocracy - Executive Producer, 2008
Carmen Electra's Aerobic Striptease - Executive Producer, Director, 2007
Envy - Executive Producer, 2007
Paula Abdul: Cardio Cheer - Executive Producer, Director 2005
MDN - Executive Producer, 2004

References

External links 
Chris Gibbin on IMDB
Chris Gibbin at Something Massive
 Advancedfilmmaking.com
 Date Night Fails at 
 The Regalist at 
 The Trailer at 

American film producers
Living people
Year of birth missing (living people)